Baghari is a village and a Gram Panchayat in Sitamarhi district  in the state of Bihar, India. The village is covered with trees.

Demographics

References

External links 
 

Cities and towns in Sitamarhi district